One Central HCM, formerly named Spirit of Saigon is a mixed-use development currently under construction consisting of a podium and two high-rise towers in Ho Chi Minh City.
The architectural firm behind the project is Arquitectonica. Upon completion, it will become the tallest twin buildings in Ho Chi Minh City.

Design
The mixed-use development is designed by American architectural firm Arquitectonica. The development consists of two high-rise towers which are connected together through a podium. The podium beneath will include 58,400sqm of retail space and will have an underground connection to the Ben Thanh metro station, the central terminus of the Ho Chi Minh City Metro.

Construction 
Construction of the tower started in 14th October 2019 and was expected to be completed in 2024.

See also

 List of tallest twin buildings and structures

Bitexco Financial Tower
List of tallest buildings in Vietnam

References

External links

One Central HCM Construction information and photos (formerly known as Spirit of Saigon).

Twin towers
Skyscrapers in Ho Chi Minh City
Arquitectonica buildings